Julian Timothy Jackson (born 10 April 1954) is a British historian who is a fellow of the British Academy and of the Royal Historical Society. He is a professor of History at Queen Mary, University of London, he is one of the leading authorities on twentieth-century France.

He was educated at Peterhouse, Cambridge, where he obtained his doctorate in 1982 and had been supervised by Professor Christopher Andrew. After many years spent at the University of Wales, Swansea, he joined the Queen Mary History Department in 2003.

Jackson’s first two books were notable contributions about the 1930s crisis in France. The Politics of Depression France 1932–1936 (Cambridge University Press, 1985) was a study of economic policy-making in France during the Depression and more generally of the Depression's impact on French politics. The Popular Front in France: Defending Democracy 1934–1938 (Cambridge: Cambridge University Press, 1988, a history of the Popular Front, encompassed its political, social and cultural dimensions.

In more recent years, Jackson’s research interests have moved on to the period after 1940. In 2001, he published an extensive synthesis of France under the Occupation entitled France: The Dark Years 1940–1944 (Oxford University Press: 2001), which was short-listed for the Los Angeles Times History Book Prize and translated into French in 2003. The French translation was commended by the judges of the Prix Philippe Viannay-Défense de la France.

Jackson’s most recent books include The Fall of France (2003) and De Gaulle (2018), and he edited The Short Oxford History of Europe 1900–1945 (Oxford: Oxford University Press, 2002). The Fall of France was one of the winners of the Wolfson History Prize for 2004. In 2009, Jackson had a study of homosexual politics in France after 1945 published in English by the University of Chicago Press.

Bibliography
 The Politics of Depression France 1932–1936 (Cambridge University Press, 1985).
 The Popular Front in France: Defending Democracy 1934-1938 (Cambridge University Press, 1988).
 France: the Dark Years 1940-1944 (Oxford University Press, 2001).
 The Fall of France (Oxford University Press, 2003).
 Living in Arcadia. Homosexuality, Politics and Morality in France from the Liberation to Aids  (University of Chicago, Press 2009).
 La Grande Illusion (BFI Publications, 2009).
 May 68: Rethinking France's Last Revolution (eds. Julian Jackson, Anna-Louise Milne, James S. Williams, Palgrave Macmillan, 2011).
 De Gaulle (Harvard University Press, 2018).

References

1954 births
Living people
Fellows of the British Academy
Fellows of the Royal Historical Society
Historians of Vichy France
Academics of Queen Mary University of London
Academics of Swansea University
Alumni of Peterhouse, Cambridge
Historians of France